Rodrigo David Naranjo López (born 30 August 1979) is a Chilean retired footballer who played as goalkeeper.

Honours

Club
Santiago Wanderers
 Primera División de Chile (1): 2001

Deportes Iquique
 Primera B (1): 2010
 Copa Chile (2): 2010, 2012–13

External links
 

1979 births
Living people
Chilean footballers
Coquimbo Unido footballers
Unión La Calera footballers
Everton de Viña del Mar footballers
Santiago Wanderers footballers
Deportes Iquique footballers
Chilean Primera División players
Primera B de Chile players
Association football goalkeepers